Geraldo "Bong" Ramos (born January 20, 1961) is a Filipino professional basketball coach of the Philippine Basketball Association.

He had previously coached teams in the Philippine Basketball Association (PBA), ASEAN Basketball League (ABL), Indonesian Basketball League (IBL), Southeast Asian Games (SEA Games), Southeast Asia Basketball Association (SEABA), Metropolitan Basketball Association (MBA), and the National Collegiate Athletic Association (NCAA).

Playing career

Ramos played point guard for teams in the Indonesian basketball circuit, the Philippine Amateur Basketball League (PABL), National Collegiate Athletic Association (NCAA), and the Philippine National Team.

He is notable as a player for the champion Mapua Cardinals in the NCAA in 1981, named Mythical 5 and Over-all Top Scorer.

He played for the Philippines under Coach Ron Jacobs in 1982-1983 with the Northern Consolidated National Team.

He was Team Captain of the ESQ Pasig Giants who emerged champions in the Asian Inter-city Basketball Tournament in Jakarta, Indonesia where he was spotted and hired as an import for the Indonesian team Pelita Jaya from 1988-1991, possibly being the first ever Filipino basketball player import. He was named Best Guard at the Pangdam Tanjangpura Cup I in 1988 in Indonesia.

1978 - 1979 Point Guard - Mapua Red Robins (HS NCAA)
1980 - 1982 Point Guard - The Mapua Cardinals (NCAA)
Co-Captain, NCAA 1981 Champion
Team Captain, NCAA 1982 Runner Up
1981 - 1982  Co-Captain, Point Guard - Philippine National Youth Team to the ASEAN School Youth
1982 - 1983 Point Guard, Northern Consolidated National Team or NCC 
1983 Point Guard - National Team Bank of Rizal (Philippine Amateur Basketball League PABL, Malaysia)
1984 Point Guard - Magnolia (PABL)
1985 Co-Captain, Point Guard - Lagerlite (PABL)
Runner up, PABL 1985
1986 Team Captain/Point Guard - ESQ Pasig Giants (PABL)
1986 Point Guard - ASEAN Intercity Basketball Tournament in Jakarta, Indonesia 
Champion
 1986 - 1987 Team Captain/Point Guard - Purefoods (PABL)
Third place, PABL 1987
1988 -1991 Player (Import), Assistant Coach - Pelita Jaya Basketball Team (Jakarta, Indonesia)
1991 Point Guard - RC Cola (Philippine Basketball League PBL)

Coaching career

When imports were banned in Indonesia, Ramos became the Assistant Coach for Pelita Jaya. He returned to Manila in 1991 to play but sustained a leg injury while training with RC Cola in the Philippine Basketball League when a player accidentally fell on his leg during a tune-up game.

Because of his injury, Bong threw in the towel as a player at the age of 30 and worked as an Account Manager for Ivy League Workwear Shoes for 5 years.

In 1997, Ramos returned to basketball as the Head Coach of the Mapua Cardinals in the NCAA.

In 1998, Ramos started his professional coaching as Head Coach of the Batangas Blades career in the MBA (Metropolitan Basketball Association).

Ramos coached the Indonesian team ASPAC-Texmaco to win its three-peat and quadruple championships in 2002 and 2003 in the emerging Indonesian basketball scene. He was named 2003 Coach of the Year of the Indonesian Basketball League. In 2003, Filipino sports headlines reported that the Philippine team got a scare when they almost lost to Indonesia in the 2003 SEA Games, after coaching under the Filipino coach. 
Ramos previously coached FedEx Express from 2004 to 2005. The former Mapua Cardinal’s coaching resume also includes a stint as the Brunei Barracudas' coach in the Asean Basketball League (ABL).  He actually coached Barako Bull before when it was still carrying the Air21 brand name in 2011. On April 30, 2018, Ramos was appointed by the Blackwater Elite to replace former head coach Leo Isaac after leading the team to a poor 0-3 in the 2018 PBA Commissioner's Cup

1997 - 1998 Head Coach - Mapua Cardinals (NCAA)
Semifinalist, NCAA 1991
1998 Assistant Coach - Batangas Blades (Metropolitan Basketball Association MBA)
1998 - 2000 Head Coach - Batangas Blades (MBA)
Quarterfinalist, MBA 1999
2000 Assistant Coach - Manila Metrostars (MBA)
Finalist, MBA 2000
Champion, SEABA 2000 in Jahor Baru, Malaysia
2001 Assistant Coach - Laguna Lakers (MBA)
Semifinalist, MBA 2001
2001 Assistant Coach - RP Men's National Team
Champion, 4th SEABA Championship 2001 in Manila
Champion, Bert Lina Cup 2001 in Laguna
Champion, 21st SEA Games 2001 in KL, Malaysia
2002 Assistant Coach - Barangay Ginebra San Miguel (Philippine Basketball Association PBA)
2002 - 2003 Head Coach - Aspac Texmaco in Jakarta, Indonesia
Champion, 2002 Kobatama Basketball League in Jakarta
Champion, 2003 Sister Cities Cup in Medan
Champion, 2003 Indonesian Basketball League in Jakarta
Quarterfinalist, 2003 ABC Champion's Cup in KL, Malaysia
Finalist, 2003 Indonesian Basketball League in Jakarta
2003 Head Coach - Indonesian National Basketball Team in the Southeast Asian Games in Vietnam
2003 Head Coach - IBL All Star Champion Team in the IBL All Star Game in Yogyakarta, Indonesia
2003 Head Coach - Hewlett-Packard ASPAC 
Quarterfinalist, ABC Champions Cup in KL, Malaysia
2004 Consultant - Hewlitt-Packard ASPAC 
Finalist, Indonesian Basketball League/IBL in Jakarta
2005 Head Coach - Fedex Express (PBA)
2005 - 2008 Assistant Coach - Talk 'n Text Phonepals (PBA)
2006 First Runner up (PBA)
2007 - 2008 Finalist (PBA)
2005 Head Coach - Sophomore PBA All-Star
Champion, 2005 PBA All Star Game in Laoag, Ilocos Norte
2008 - 2009 Head Coach - CLS Knights in Surabaya, Indonesia
Final 4, Indonesian Basketball League (IBL)
2009 Head Coach - Garuda Flexi Bandung
3rd Place, Indonesian Basketball League (IBL)
2009 - 2010 Head Coach, Brunei Barracudas - Asean Basketball League (ABL)
2011 Head Coach - Air 21 Express (PBA)
2011 Assistant Coach - Barako Bull Energy (PBA)
2012–2014 Head Coach - Barako Bull Energy (PBA)
2015 Assistant Coach  - Blackwater Elite (PBA)
2017 - present Head Coach - Stapac in Jakarta, Indonesia

Awards and Distinctions

 Coach of the Year, Indonesian Basketball League, 2003
 All-Star Winning Coach, Indonesian Basketball League, 2003
Best Point Guard in the Pangdam Tanjangpura Cup I while playing as an import for Pelita Jaya in Jakarta, Indonesia, 1988
Mythical 5 and Over-all Top Scorer in the NCAA in while playing for the Mapua Cardinals, 1982
Over-all Top Scorer in the NCAA while playing for the Mapua Cardinals, 1981
PBA All-Star Winning Coach 2005, Sophomore Team in Laoag, Ilocos Norte

Career records

PBA

References

1961 births
Living people
Filipino men's basketball coaches
Filipino men's basketball players
Barangay Ginebra San Miguel coaches
Filipino expatriate sportspeople in Indonesia
Expatriate basketball people in Indonesia
Mapúa Cardinals basketball players
Mapúa Cardinals basketball coaches
Philippines men's national basketball team coaches
Barako Bull Energy coaches
TNT Tropang Giga coaches
Blackwater Bossing coaches